Keryeh-ye Abdolah Shiravand (also Romanized as Keryeh-ye ʿAbdolah Shīrāvand; also known as Keryeh-ye Shīrāvand, Shīrāvand, and Sharawand) is a village in Teshkan Rural District, Chegeni District, Dowreh County, Lorestan Province, Iran. At the 2006 census, its population was 76, in 14 families.

References 

Towns and villages in Dowreh County